Turan Özdemir (born 11 October 1952, Muğla - 15 January 2018, Istanbul) was a Turkish actor and voice actor. In 2006, he received the Best Actor Award at the 13th Golden Boll Film Festival for his role in the movie "Donut Gaymak".

Selected filmography

References

External links 

1952 births
2018 deaths
Turkish male film actors
Turkish voice actors
Turkish actors
People from Muğla